Louis Ruiz (born August 7, 1953) is a Democratic member of the Kansas House of Representatives, representing several districts in Kansas City since 2005. He is a retired employee of Lucent Technologies.

Committee membership
 Commerce and Labor (Ranking Member)
 Federal and State Affairs
 Government Efficiency and Fiscal Oversight
 Joint Committee on Health Policy Oversight

Major donors
The top 5 donors to Ruiz's 2008 campaign:
1. Kansas Contractors Assoc 	$1,000 	
2. Kansans for Lifesaving Cures 	$750 	
3. Kansas Opt Assoc Gay Robbins-Exec Dir 	$500 	
4. Kelly, Pam 	$500 	
5. AstraZeneca $500

References

External links
 Kansas Legislature - Louis Ruiz
 Project Vote Smart profile
 Kansas Votes profile
 State Surge - Legislative and voting track record
 Follow the Money campaign contributions:
 2004, 2006, 2008

Democratic Party members of the Kansas House of Representatives
Hispanic and Latino American state legislators
Living people
1953 births
21st-century American politicians